Nature's Path Foods, commonly known as Nature's Path, is a privately held, family-owned producer of certified organic foods. Originally known for its breakfast cereals, it now has a portfolio of more than 150 products. Founded in 1985 by Arran and Ratana Stephens, Nature's Path employs approximately 500 people, with manufacturing facilities in Canada and the United States and sales in more than 40 countries.  All of its products are vegetarian, certified organic, and Non-GMO Project Verified.  Nature's Path is a triple bottom line social enterprise, and has been recognized for incorporating the notion of sustainability into its business practices through its support of various charitable and eco-friendly initiatives.  The company is regularly named one of Canada's best employers.

History

The company was started by Arran Stephens and Ratana Stephens in 1985 in British Columbia, Canada and the first product was Manna Bread. The Stephens' son, Arjan, and daughters, Jyoti and Gurdeep, currently work at Nature's Path. Prior to opening Nature's Path, Arran Stephens opened Canada's first large organic supermarket in 1971, called Lifestream, and sold a successful line of natural products.  Lifestream was sold to Kraft in 1981, but bought back by Stephens in 1995. In September 2018, Nature's Path announced plans to move their head office from Richmond to East Vancouver.

Awards

Nature's Path has been voted among Canada's Best 50 Employers in Canada in 2007, 2009, 2011 and 2012, and among Canada's Greenest Employers in 2009, 2011 and 2012.

The Organic Trade Association recognized founders Arran and Ratana Stephens with the award for Growing Organic Leadership in 2013 and a Nature's Path farmer, Doug Crabtree, with the Farmer of the Year award. Food in Canada recognized Nature's Path with the 2014 award for Leadership in Sustainability.

Environmental and social sustainability

Nature's Path helped to establish the Sustainable Food Trade Association and in 2009 was one of the first companies to sign onto the Food Trade Sustainability Leadership Association's Declaration of Sustainability to promote sustainable practices in the food industry.

The company became zero waste certified in 2010 and have committed to complete carbon neutrality by 2020. So far Nature's Path has successfully implemented practices that have diverted 92 per cent of their waste from landfills; reduced packaging saving 825,540 gallons of wastewater, 437 tons of paperboard, 7,464 million BTUs of energy and 1.4 million pounds of carbon dioxide; they have launched a supplier code of conduct for labor; empowered employees to take ownership of sustainability and green initiatives; and through their commitment to organic farming have kept over 418,000 lbs of chemical pesticides out of the soil.

Nature's Path is committed to many charitable and social initiatives. Their Gardens for Good program awards three $15,000 grants to urban gardens to help educate and feed their communities every year – totalling $270,000 so far; they hold an Eat Well Do Good foodraiser for food banks every year which has raised over $750,000 in food to date. Additionally Nature's Path's Bite for Bite program commits $1 million to North American food banks and through the EnviroKidz brand's 1% for the Planet affiliation, work to help save endangered species.

Organic farming 

Non-GMO support 
Nature's Path has been a staunch opponent of GMO proliferation since 2001, and founder Arran Stephens was an early supporter and board member of the Non-GMO Project. Nature's Path products are tested to bear the Non-GMO Project Verified Seal. The brand sponsored the making of documentary GMO OMG by Jeremy Seifert in 2013 and the Right2Know GMO March in 2011. The company was active in supporting the failed Proposition 37, previously the California Right to Know ballot initiative, for mandatory GMO labeling in California by contributing $600,000, plus time and support, as well as supporting the Oregon and Colorado Right to Know campaigns in 2014.

Products

The company's organic products are sold under the Nature's Path, Love Crunch, Qi’a, Flax Plus, and EnviroKidz brand names in grocery and specialty foods stores in over 42 countries worldwide.

All Nature's Path products are certified organic and vegetarian, many are vegan, and a large number are gluten-free.

References

External links
Nature's Path
Nature's Path on Twitter
Nature's Path on Facebook

Canadian brands
Companies based in Richmond, British Columbia
Food and drink companies established in 1985
1985 establishments in Canada
Food and drink companies of Canada
Organic farming organizations
Privately held companies of Canada
1985 establishments in British Columbia
Breakfast cereal companies
Vegetarian companies and establishments of Canada